Lester Ralph (1876 or 1877 – 1927) was an artist who illustrated for several publications.

Personal life 
Ralph was the  son of author and journalist Julian Ralph.

In 1904, Ralph married war correspondent Elsie Reasoner, who became a famous model and sculptor. In 1913, she died of phlebitis in Lloyd, Florida, and was buried at the Ralph family plot in New Jersey. On September 24th , 1913, Lester married Pauline Rohl.  Together they had three daughters: Pauline Ralph, born March 30th, 1915, Jean Ralph, born April 19th, 1917, and Eileen Ralph, born March 1st 1919.

Ralph survived typhoid but died of appendicitis at the age of 48.

Work 
Ralph painted war scenes of the Greco-Turkish War of 1897 and First and Second Anglo-Boer wars. His classic Girl Scout poster is part of the Pritzker Military Museum & Library collection. The face from the poster was also used for Girl Scout pins.

He and W. B. Wollen  designed special menu cards for a dinner of dignitaries. He illustrated his father's account "In the Wake of the War" from the Turkish side of the war with Greece.

Ralph also covered the Anglo-Boer War.

He provided illustrations for Mark Twain's "Eve's Diary" in Harper's. When a Charlton, Massachusetts library expelled the book due to nude depictions by Ralph, Twain commented amusedly on the irony of making the Bible freely available.

Ralph illustrated stories in Scribner's Magazine and Collier's, as well as Owen Wister's 1906 novel Lady Baltimore.

His illustrations of people dancing, including The One Step, featured on postcards and he also illustrated a Walk-Over shoe company catalog in 1916.

Ralph was one of the artists whose illustrations were included in the gift book A Book of Sweethearts marketed as having each picture a "climax of charm and color".

Bibliography
Lady Baltimore by Owen Wister

References

1870s births
Year of birth uncertain
1927 deaths
19th-century war artists
American illustrators